Sun Kai (Chinese: 孙凯; Pinyin: Sūn Kǎi; born 26 March 1991 in Shanghai) is a Chinese footballer who plays as a left-back or left winger for China League One side Zibo Cuju, on loan from Chongqing Liangjiang.

Club career
Born in Shanghai, Sun joined Genbao Football Academy in July 2000. He was promoted to academy's first team Shanghai East Asia squad in 2007 and followed Shanghai East Asia to win promotion to the second tier. He didn't play as a regular starter until 2011, when some regular players such as Wang Jiayu, Cao Yunding, Jiang Zhipeng and Zhang Linpeng left the club. Appearing in 21 league match, he was selected into best squad of 2011 League One season by Sina. Sun made 22 league appearances in the 2012 season, as Shanghai East Asia won the champions and promoted to the top flight. In January 2014, Sun was signed for fellow Chinese Super League side Shanghai Shenxin.

Sun joined Shanghai Shenhua at the beginning of the 2017 league season, however was unable to register for league matches due to the club having reached their maximum transfer slot limit and he played for reserve team instead. On 7 February 2018, Shanghai Shenhua officially announced Sun's inclusion in the club's first team. He made his debut for Shenhua on 7 March 2018 in a 1–1 away draw against Korean club Suwon Samsung Bluewings in the 2018 AFC Champions League. Sun would make his league debut for the club the following season on 15 August 2019 against Tianjin Tianhai F.C. in a 2-2 draw.

Career statistics 
Statistics accurate as of match played 31 December 2020.

Honours

Club
Shanghai East Asia
 China League One: 2012
 China League Two: 2007

Shanghai Shenhua
Chinese FA Cup: 2019

References

External links
 

1991 births
Living people
Chinese footballers
Footballers from Shanghai
Shanghai Port F.C. players
Shanghai Shenxin F.C. players
Shanghai Shenhua F.C. players
Chinese Super League players
China League One players
China League Two players
Association football midfielders